The Mozambique national futsal team, nicknamed Os Mambas, represents Mozambique in international and African futsal competitions. It is affiliated to the Mozambican Football Federation.

Tournament records
 *Denotes draws include knockout matches decided on penalty kicks.
 **Gold background color indicates that the tournament was won.
 ***Red border color indicates tournament was held on home soil.''

FIFA Futsal World Cup

Africa Futsal Cup of Nations

Grand Prix de Futsal

See also
Mozambique national football team

References

External links
 Federação Moçambicana de Futebol 

African national futsal teams
Futsal